Collins Ochieng Otieno (born 9 June 1987) is a Kenyan former footballer who played as a defender.

Career
Born in Kakamega, Ochieng played club football for Ulinzi Stars and Nairobi City Stars.

He earned 5 caps for the Kenyan national team.

References

1987 births
Living people
Kenyan footballers
Kenya international footballers
Ulinzi Stars F.C. players
Nairobi City Stars players
Association football defenders
People from Kakamega